Robert Swink (June 3, 1918 – August 15, 2000) was an American film editor who edited nearly 60 feature films during a career that spanned 46 years.

Born in Rocky Ford, Colorado, Swink and his family moved to Hollywood in 1927. After graduating from North Hollywood High School in 1936, he joined RKO Pictures as an editing apprentice. During World War II, he edited training films for the Army Special Services. His first screen credit was the 1943 comedy short Double Up.

For the next five years, Swink edited mostly B movies until George Stevens hired him for I Remember Mama (1948). He edited several Westerns in 1950, and the following year was hired by William Wyler to work on Detective Story. It was the first of 11 projects on which the two men collaborated. Swink left RKO to join Wyler at Paramount in 1952, and his credits at the studio include Carrie (1952), Roman Holiday (1953), and The Desperate Hours (1955). Among his assistants in this era was Hal Ashby, who became a distinguished editor and director.

In 1964, Swink edited The Best Man for Franklin J. Schaffner. They worked together on four additional films, including Papillon (1973), Islands in the Stream (1977), The Boys from Brazil (1978), and Sphinx (1981). Swink came out of retirement to edit the 1989 film Welcome Home when Schaffner died right after completing principal photography on the project.

Swink worked as a second unit director on The Big Country (1958), The Collector (1965), How to Steal a Million (1968), The Only Game in Town (1970), and The Liberation of L.B. Jones (1970). 

Swink was nominated for the Academy Award for Best Film Editing for Roman Holiday (1953), Funny Girl (1968), and The Boys from Brazil (1978). He received the American Cinema Editors Career Achievement Award in 1993.

Swink died of a heart attack in Santa Maria, California.

Selected filmography
 Roman Holiday (1953)
 Funny Girl (1968; co-nominated with Maury Winetrobe and William Sands)
 The Boys from Brazil'' (1978)

See also
List of film director and editor collaborations

References

External links 

People from Rocky Ford, Colorado
1918 births
2000 deaths
People from Santa Maria, California
American film editors
North Hollywood High School alumni